Pedro Núñez del Valle (Madrid, c. 1597 – 1649) was a Spanish painter of the Baroque era.

According to Antonio Palomino he was born in Madrid where he lived and worked for the rest of his life after studying in Rome. He was one of the painters concerned in drawing the pictures of the Kings in the Salón de Comedias.

References
An account of the lives and works of the most eminent Spanish painters, sculptors and architects, tr. (by U. Price) from the Musæum pictorium (Versione inglese, 1739), p. 38

External links

Pedro Núñez on Artcyclopedia
Online article at the Museo del Prado

17th-century Spanish painters
Spanish male painters
Spanish Renaissance painters
Spanish expatriates in Italy
1590s births
1649 deaths